Philippe Meyer (born 19 April 1969) is a French politician of the Republicans who has been serving as a deputy of the National Assembly from 2020 to 2022, representing Bas-Rhin's 6th constituency.

References 

1969 births
Living people
21st-century French politicians
Deputies of the 15th National Assembly of the French Fifth Republic
The Republicans (France) politicians